Ubrique is a municipality of Spain located in the province of Cádiz, in the autonomous community of Andalusia. According to the 2005 census, it has a population of 17,362 inhabitants. It is the most important municipality in the Sierra de Cádiz.

The most important industry is leather

As part of the pueblos blancos (white towns) in southern Spain's Andalusia region, Ubrique reminds travellers of that area's Arab past. Situated at the foot of the Sierra de Ubrique.

Geography 
Ubrique is located between two Natural Parks: Grazalema and Los Alcornocales Los Alcornocales Natural Park.
Thanks to its location, it is surrounded by a rocky landscape with a great diversity of flora (olive trees, carob trees, cork oaks, holm oaks, etc.) and abundant fauna (vultures, birds of prey, mountain goats, etc.) mainly on the highest mountainous areas located in the valley of the Aljibe. The Ubrique River divides the town in half, although it also has another river: Tavizna River.

Demographics

References
Citations

Bibliography

External links 

Ubrique official statistics -

Municipalities of the Province of Cádiz